Samarskyi District is an urban district of the city of Dnipro, in southern Ukraine. It is located at the confluence of the Dnieper and Samara rivers in the eastern and southeastern parts of the city.

History
The district was created on 6 April 1977 out of the neighborhood of Samar previously in the Industrialnyi District and the newly added cities of Prydniprovsk (1956–1977) and Ihren (1959–1977) as well as a historic Cossack settlement of Chapli. Archeologic founds suggest that Samar existed in 1524. Archaeologists of the Dnipro National University have discovered artifacts there dated around 1520s.

The town of Prydniprovsk was created around the Prydniprovsk State District Power Station (DRES), today a thermal power station that was built in 1954, while the town of Ihren was created around the Ihren Rail Station, which still exists since 1873. They were both absorbed into the boundaries of the Samarskyi District.

Neighborhoods
 Chapli
 Ihren
 Kseniivka
 Nyzhnodniprovsk-Vuzol
 Odynkivka
 Pivnichnyi
 Prydniprovsk
 Samar, Dnipro
 Shevchenko
 Stara Ihren

Gallery

References

External links

  at the Dnipro City Council website 

Urban districts of Dnipro
States and territories established in 1977
1977 establishments in Ukraine